In Greek mythology, Milye (Ancient Greek: Μιλύης) was a local eponymous heroine and sister of Solymus, thus possible daughter of Zeus and Chaldene or Calchedonia. Her first husband was her own brother and later on of Cragus, son of Tremilus and the nymph Praxidice.

Notes

References 

 Stephanus of Byzantium, Stephani Byzantii Ethnicorum quae supersunt, edited by August Meineike (1790-1870), published 1849. A few entries from this important ancient handbook of place names have been translated by Brady Kiesling. Online version at the Topos Text Project.

Children of Zeus
Lycians
Women in Greek mythology
Lycia